Arthur Symonds (8 May 1890 – 20 April 1946) was a New Zealand cricketer. He played one first-class match for Otago in 1926/27.

See also
 List of Otago representative cricketers

References

External links
 

1890 births
1946 deaths
New Zealand cricketers
Otago cricketers
Cricketers from Dunedin